Cyanogen is a chemical compound.

Cyanogen may also refer to:

 CyanogenMod, the Android firmware
 Steve Kondik, the lead developer of CyanogenMod nicknamed "Cyanogen"